Tabernaemontana ternifolia is a species of plant in the family Apocynaceae. It is found in Palawan.

References

ternifolia